There are a number of treaties known as the Basic Treaty

 Treaty on Basic Relations between Japan and the Republic of Korea (June 22, 1965)
 The Basic Treaty of 1972 in common usage stands for the "Treaty concerning the basis of relations between the Federal Republic of Germany and the German Democratic Republic".
 European Basic Treaty
 Bilateral Basic Treaty between Russia and Romania (July 4, 2003).